Eyes Like the Sky is the second studio album by Australian psychedelic rock band King Gizzard & the Lizard Wizard. It was released on 22 February 2013 on the label Flightless.

Described as a "cult western audio book", the album is narrated and written by Broderick Smith, the frontman for the 1970s Australian rock group The Dingoes and the father of King Gizzard keyboardist Ambrose Kenny Smith. The story revolves around child soldiers, native Americans and gun fights, all set in the American frontier.

When asked about the album's influences, Stu Mackenzie alluded to the spaghetti western influence throughout the album, stating "I love Western films. I love bad guys and I love Red Dead Redemption. Oh, and I love evil guitars".

Track listing 
Vinyl releases have tracks 1–5 on side A, and tracks 6–10 on side B.

Personnel 
Credits for Eyes Like the Sky adapted from liner notes.
 King Gizzard & the Lizard Wizard – music writing, arrangement, recording, mixing
 Michael Cavanagh
 Cook Craig
 Ambrose Kenny-Smith
 Eric Moore
 Stu Mackenzie
 Lucas Skinner
 Joe Walker
 Broderick Smith – story writing, narration recording
 Jason Galea – cover art
 Joseph Carra – mastering

Charts

References

2013 albums
King Gizzard & the Lizard Wizard albums
Concept albums
Flightless (record label) albums
Garage rock albums by Australian artists